Great Barrier Reef is a three-part BBC documentary series. Narrated by David Attenborough, its three episodes aired over December 2015 and into January 2016. The series was released on DVD and Blu-ray in January 2016.

The MV Alucia was used as a base for the series.

Synopses

Episode 1: Builders
This episode explores the creatures that inhabit the Great Barrier Reef off the northeastern coast of Australia on board the research vessel MV Alucia. Attenborough goes deep into the ocean on board Alucia'''s Triton submersible. He pays a visit to Lizard Island.

Episode 2: Visitors
Attenborough starts out on Osprey Reef. Hammerhead sharks pick up signals from the Earth's magnetic field. Some sharks travel to Raine Island. Attenborough goes to a green turtle rookery on Raine Island.

Heron Island is to the south of Raine Island.

Manta rays are the nomads of the Great Barrier Reef. Manta rays feed on the plankton. Many of these manta rays make their way to Lady Elliot Island.  Kathy Townsend has been tracking manta rays and studying them for the last seven years.

Episode 3: Survival
Cyclones are the biggest killers of the reef's corals. SS Yongala was sunk by a cyclone in 1911. Cyclone Yasi in 2011 ripped many corals and exposed the top of the sunken Yongala''.

Another threat to corals are coral-eating starfishes known as crown-of-thorns starfishes.

Animals featured

Episode 1
Attenborough discusses reef residents.
coral polyps
clownfish
sea anemone
mantis shrimp with up to 16 photoreceptors

Episode 2
tiger shark
Green sea turtle
noddies
Wedge-tailed shearwater
wrasse, small fish
humpback whales
dwarf minke whale

Episode 3
Epaulette shark
Crown-of-thorns starfish

Contributors
Experts who appeared in the series include:
Kathy Townsend
Justin Marshall

References

External links

2015 British television series debuts
2016 British television series endings
David Attenborough
Great Barrier Reef
2010s Australian documentary television series
BBC high definition shows
Documentary films about marine biology
BBC television documentaries
English-language television shows